Arthur A. Hauser (born June 19, 1929) is a former American football defensive lineman who played professionally in the National Football League (NFL) and the American Football League (AFL).

College career
Hauser attended Xavier University in Cincinnati from 1950 to 1954 and played four seasons as a defensive tackle and special teams stalwart for the Musketeers.

Professional
He played seven seasons for the Los Angeles Rams (1954–1957), the Chicago Cardinals (1959), the New York Giants (1959), the Boston Patriots (1960), and the Denver Broncos (1961).

Life after football
Hauser was an NFL scout for Miami Dolphins, among other organizations, a substitute teacher and a car salesman.  He has since successfully transitioned into insurance sales.  He moved back to Cincinnati, the hometown of his wife Joan Hauser and the location of his alma mater Xavier University, and started Art Hauser Insurance Company.  After decades of running this successful insurance company, he imparted it to his son Christopher Hauser who now runs Chris Hauser Insurance in Cincinnati.  Art is now the owner and chief operator of H&R Candy, a candy vending machine company with operations across the Midwest, Southeast, and Northeastern portions of the United States. While maintaining a presence in this company, Art also spends much of his time with his family in Cincinnati.

Hauser now lives in Hyde Park with his wife Joan, on the east side of Cincinnati.  They are the parents of six children and they have 15 grandchildren.

References

1929 births
Living people
American football defensive tackles
Xavier Musketeers football players
Boston Patriots players
Chicago Cardinals players
Denver Broncos (AFL) players
Los Angeles Rams players
Miami Dolphins scouts
New York Giants players
American Football League players
People from Hartford, Wisconsin
Players of American football from Wisconsin
People from Rubicon, Wisconsin